Aaf Bouber (17 October 1885 – 23 May 1974) was a Dutch stage, film and television actress. She was born Aafje ten Hoope and married the stage actor Herman Bouber in 1907.

Selected filmography
 Fatum (1915)
 The Wreck in the North Sea (1915)
 Genie tegen geweld (1916)
 Cirque hollandais (1924)
 Oranje Hein (1925)
 Op Hoop van Zegen (1934)
 Ergens in Nederland (1940)
 De Laatste Dagen van een Eiland (1942)

External links

1885 births
1974 deaths
Dutch film actresses
Dutch silent film actresses
Dutch stage actresses
People from Hoorn